Corona, in comics, may refer to:

 Corona, an alias used by the Eternal Thena
 Corona, a Marvel Comics character and member of The Initiative-incarnation of The Order
 Corona, a mutant from the alternate future of Here Comes Tomorrow

References

See also
Corona (disambiguation)